Jadval-e Now or Javdal Now may refer to:
 Jadval-e Now, Fars
 Javdal-e Now, alternate name of Eslamiyeh, Fars
 Jadval-e Now, Shiraz, Fars Province
 Jadval-e Now, Kerman
 Jadval-e Now, Kohgiluyeh and Boyer-Ahmad